Sofie Johansson (born 1 July 1985) is a Swedish orienteering competitor. She won a bronze medal in the relay event at the 2008 World Orienteering Championships in Olomouc, together with Annika Billstam and Helena Jansson. She finished 6th in the long distance at the same championship.

References

External links

1985 births
Living people
Swedish orienteers
Female orienteers
Foot orienteers
World Orienteering Championships medalists